Khush Singh (born September 15, 1975) is an Indian-born American make-up artist, producer, director, and businesswoman. She is the CEO of mKarma Cosmetics. and Karma Portfolios. Her products are sold in over 100 stores five countries in Southeast Asia and the US.

Biography 
Khush graduated from Florida International University and promptly delved into the entertainment industry as an independent director and TV News Reporter for TV Asia. She returned to the New York in 1999 to focus on other artistic endeavours and explore the possibility of creating a line of cosmetics for South Asians. The brand debuted in Toronto at the Canadian Cosmetics Show. The success of that initial makeup line led to the development and launch of the Indian line Khush in 2006.

In addition to creating cover looks for magazines, celebrities and make-up for fashion shows, Khush has been the key makeup artist on several TV shows and pilots. She is the author of two books: The Asian women: Beauty and Glamour and The Eyes have it!  Khush describes her makeup passion as that of: "My work is driven by a passion yearning to be released onto a canvas."

Film 
Khush has also produced and directed several shorts, reality TV shows and movies under the banner of her production company mKarma including Faces, Choices, A Legacy Lost, TV Asia (TV Series), Day Care Diaries (TV Series), Mom's Cooking (TV Series – Makeup) and the critically acclaimed The Bicycle.

Khush has produced her first feature along with Michael Wechsler, Jonathan Sanger and Rick Porras called The Red Robin

Filmography & Television

Personal life 
Khush lives in New Jersey with her son Ishi and has houses in Toronto, Mumbai and upstate New York.

Books 
 Khush Singh Beauty: The Asian Women: Beauty and Glamour (2005) 
 Khush Singh Beauty: The Eyes Have It! (2007)

References

External links 
 IMDB Profile
 Interview with Khush Singh
 Official Website (United States)
 Judd Hirsch to star in 'Robin'
 Montreal Festival Adds Judd Hirsch's 'The Red Robin' to Competition Slate 

1979 births
Living people
American cosmetics businesspeople
American people of Indian descent
American make-up artists
Businesspeople from New York City
Florida International University alumni
Indian emigrants to the United States
Indian make-up artists
American women artists of Indian descent
Businesspeople from Ahmedabad
Businesswomen from Gujarat
Film directors from New York City
American women film producers
Film producers from New York (state)
21st-century American women